Erythranthe glaucescens is a species of monkeyflower known by the common name shieldbract monkeyflower. It was formerly known as Mimulus glaucescens.

Distribution
It is endemic to California, where it is known only from the foothills of the southernmost Cascade Range and adjacent northernmost Sierra Nevada. It grows in moist areas, such as seeps.

Description
Erythranthe glaucescens is an annual herb varying in maximum height from 6 to 80 centimeters. The stem is hairless and waxy. The oval to rounded leaves are up to 7 centimeters long and are sometimes borne on petioles. The inflorescence is a raceme of flowers with a distinctive pair of bracts completely fused around the stem to form a rounded disc up to 4.5 centimeters wide. The flowers are up to 3.5 centimeters long, spreading at the mouth into an upper lip with two notched lobes and a lower lip with three. The flower often has red spotting in the mouth.

References

External links
Jepson Manual Treatment - Mimulus glaucescens
USDA Plants Profile
Mimulus glaucescens - Photo gallery

glaucescens
Endemic flora of California
Flora of the Cascade Range
Flora of the Sierra Nevada (United States)
Flora without expected TNC conservation status